Scarisbrick Hall is a country house situated just to the south-east of the village of Scarisbrick in Lancashire, England.

History
Scarisbrick Hall was the ancestral home of the Scarisbrick family and dates back to the time of King Stephen (1135–1154). This half-timbered, manor house is recorded in an early 13th-century deed. The area is protected by scheduled monument status.

The Scarisbrick family lived on the site from 1238 until the house was sold in 1946 to become a training college. Parts of the present building, which is considered to be one of the finest examples of Victorian Gothic architecture in England, were designed by the architect Augustus Pugin. The most notable feature of Scarisbrick Hall is the 100-foot tower, which is visible from many miles around.

Ann Scarisbrick Eccleston (Lady Hunloke) inherited the Scarisbrick estate – previously owned by Sir Talbot Scarisbrick, 1st Baronet – from her brother Charles in 1860 at the age of 72. At about this time she assumed by Royal Licence the surname Scarisbrick, and was thereafter known as Lady Scarisbrick. She had earlier fought a long legal battle with Charles, after the death of their elder brother Thomas Scarisbrick in 1835, over the inheritance claim to the Scarisbrick estate. She lost the case to Charles after five long years of litigation. Ann was known to be a woman of great character and resolve and is credited for the extensive enhancement and restoration of the Scarisbrick Hall in the lavish Gothic style, employing E. W. Pugin as the architect.

Ann Scarisbrick, born in 1788, was a great beauty in her youth. In 1807 she married Sir Thomas Windsor Hunloke (1773–1816), of Wingerworth Hall Derbyshire, who was 15 years her senior. Her husband died nine years after their marriage. They had four children, two sons and two daughters. After the birth of these children, the family went to live in Paris. It is there that Sir Thomas Windsor Hunloke died in 1816. Their daughter Eliza married the Marquis de Casteja afterwards, also in Paris. It was only in June 1861 that she returned to Scarisbrick and made Scarisbrick Hall her home for the rest of her life.

When she returned to Scarisbrick Hall in 1861, she did so with great pomp and style. She threw a lavish meal of roasted sheep and oxen, beer and bread to more than 1000 Scarisbrick tenants. Upon her arrival, most of Ormskirk turned out ringing bells and waving flags. Her carriage was accompanied with a band on her way to Scarisbrick Hall.

Ann, unlike her brother, lived in much splendour at Scarisbrick Hall. During her occupation, the hall was gas-lit for the first time. The central heating system seems to have been installed and used during her period of occupation. Ann was popular as a society hostess and held many gala events at her residence and estate. Even though Ann, under the terms of her brother's will, had only inherited Scarisbrick Hall and not its furnishings she set out to redecorate and redesign the house on a much grander scale than had prevailed in the time of her predecessor.

The renovations were carried out by Edward W. Pugin, the son of the architect Augustus Pugin who had created the designs of the hall during the time of Charles Scarisbrick. Ann allowed the younger Pugin greater scope than had been afforded to his father. It was during this time that the older clock tower, dating from the time of Charles Scarisbrick, was replaced with a grander and taller example built in the French Gothic style.  A new East Wing was added, which Ann dedicated to the memory of her father. This wing was joined to the older building by an octagonal tower which was decorated with eight doves signifying the Scarisbrick family connection.

Ann had a good relationship with E. W. Pugin, to whom she gave much artistic freedom and who created a lavish living environment for her, down to the smallest details like her inkstand and notepaper.

Ann lived to the age of 84, dying in 1872 at Scarisbrick. The estate was inherited by her daughter Eliza, the sole surviving child, after her death and then to her French progeny, Emmanuel de Biaudos, Marquis de Castéja. Scarisbrick Hall was incorporated into the Castéja family properties and the Hall was subject to very few changes. In memory of his wife who died in 1878, the marquis built the church of St. Elizabeth on the site of the former Catholic chapel.

Scarisbrick Hall remained in Castéja's family until 1923 when André de Biaudos de Castéja and his wife Pauline d'Espeuilles decided to sell it to Charles Scarisbrick's grandson, Sir Tom Talbot Leyland Scarisbrick.

Founded in 1964 by Charles Oxley, the building is now occupied by a co-educational, independent school called Scarisbrick Hall School and there is no public access apart from infrequent guided tours. Following Oxley's death, the school was sold and subsequent owners include the educational group Nord Anglia and GeMs. After GeMs sold the school unexpectedly, the parents rallied together to get the school up and running again but a lot of students trying to do their GCSEs had to move schools. The school is now being rented by the ownership group Friends of Kingswood made up of parents, teachers, and former pupils.

Scarisbrick Hall is a Grade I listed building and is on the Buildings at Risk Register. The cost of repairs to the building has been estimated at £2.46 million.

Filming location
Scenes from the Channel 4 series Utopia were filmed in late 2012 at Scarisbrick Hall. The Great Hall and Oak Room were featured in the series.
An outdoor soccer match in the movie There's only one Jimmy Grimble (2000)  was filmed in the grounds of Scarisbrick Hall.

Gallery

See also
Listed buildings in Scarisbrick
Scheduled monuments in Lancashire

References

External links

Country houses in Lancashire
Gothic Revival architecture in Lancashire
Grade I listed houses
Grade I listed buildings in Lancashire
Buildings and structures in the Borough of West Lancashire
Grade II listed parks and gardens in Lancashire
Augustus Pugin buildings